Radio Active is the title of an album released by Pat Travers on Polydor Records in 1981. 
Radio Active was Pat Travers' first  release after the highly successful Crash and Burn. However, Pat Thrall and Tommy Aldridge had already left the band.  Travers and Cowling forged on with former Blackjack drummer Sandy Gennaro, but the album barely made it into the Top 40. It was quite different from Travers' previous work, with more emphasis on keyboards than heavy guitars. Disappointed with the lack of sales, Polygram dropped Travers from their roster. Travers' successfully sued Polydor for breach of contract which he won which allowed him to record two future albums on the label.

Radio Active was recorded at Bee Jay Recording Studios in Orlando, Florida from October 1980 to February 1981.

Track listing 
All tracks composed by Pat Travers except where indicated
"New Age Music" (Roger Lewis, Ian Lewis, Jacob Miller, Bernard Harvey) – 5:05
"My Life is on the Line" – 3:43
"(I Just Wanna) Live it My Way" – 5:32
"I Don't Wanna Be Awake" – 3:54
"I Can Love You" – 2:24
"Untitled" – 3:25
"Feelin' In Love" – 3:30
"Play It Like You See It" – 5:12
"Electric Detective" - 3:07

Personnel

Pat Travers - guitar, keyboard, vocals
Peter "Mars" Cowling - bass guitar
Sandy Gennaro - drums
Michael Shrieve - percussion

Additional Personnel
Pat Thrall - guitar
Tommy Aldridge - drums

Charts
Album - Billboard

References

External links

1981 albums
Pat Travers albums
Polydor Records albums